Rugby Sport for the Disabled Association (RSDA) is a registered charity based in Rugby, Warwickshire that exists to promote and provide sport, recreation and leisure activities for disabled people in the local area.

Origins

Rugby Sport for the Disabled Association (RSDA) meets at  The Queen's Diamond Jubilee Centre, in Rugby  and has been running since 1975 
By mid 1977 RSDA was a thriving organisation. As well as their regular Saturday morning activities they were attending competitions around The Midlands and going on twinning trips abroad. The twinning trips eventually became tripartite weekends involving Rugby in England, Évreux in France and Rüsselsheim in Germany.   The three towns hosted the annual weekends in rotation.
</P>
RSDA had also become heavily involved in raft-racing; an involvement that lasted over 20 years, culminating in crossing the English Channel in both 2002 and 2003, under the auspices of The Channel Crossing Association. During those 20 years the RSDA raft had won many races against able-bodies crews, had shot many weirs and had raced across the Menai Strait, navigating the treacherous tidal rapids, known as the Swellies.

Notable members

Karen Davidson (athlete), an RSDA member, won four medals, including a Gold at the 1984 Summer Paralympics in New York City.
</P>
Iris Bingham, who is currently the World Crossbow Shooters Association World Champion for the Ladies Assisted Target Crossbow.

See also
 Ken Marriott Leisure Centre

References and notes

Charities based in Warwickshire